Ugo Intini (born 30 June 1941) is an Italian journalist and politician.

Biography
A long-time member of the Italian Socialist Party (PSI) and close aide of Bettino Craxi, he was spokesman of the PSI and representative of the party in the Socialist International. He founded the Socialist Party (PS) in 1996 and joined the Italian Democratic Socialists (SDI) in 1998.

He led the electoral list of PSI in the region Liguria after Pertini and therefore was elected three times in the Chambre of deputies from 1983 to 1994. In 2001 (until 2006) he was elected again in a uninominal constituency of Genova Est. He served two times in the Government: from 2000 to 2001 as undersecretary to the Foreign Affairs  and from 2006 to 2008 as Deputy Minister.

From 1981 to 1987, he was editor of the daily newspaper of the Italian Socialist Party “Avanti!”  Among his many books, there is a history of this newspaper, whose editors were Bissolati, Mussolini, Gramsci, Nenni, Saragat, Pertini and Craxi.

References

Living people
1941 births
Italian Socialist Party politicians
Italian Democratic Socialist Party politicians
20th-century Italian politicians
Socialist Party (Italy, 1996) politicians
Italian Socialist Party (2007) politicians
21st-century Italian politicians